Jesperi Kotkaniemi (born 6 July 2000) is a Finnish professional ice hockey center currently playing for the Carolina Hurricanes of the National Hockey League (NHL). He was drafted third overall by the Montreal Canadiens in the 2018 NHL Entry Draft. In October 2018, he became the first player born in the 2000s to play in one of the major professional sports leagues in the United States and Canada, when he appeared on the Canadiens opening night roster.

Personal life 
Kotkaniemi was raised in Pori, the son of Mikael and Kati Kotkaniemi. Mikael, a former professional hockey player and current coach, and native of Helsinki, settled in Pori after meeting Kati, a Pori area native, while he was playing for Ässät. Kotkaniemi has one brother, Kasperi, who is sixteen months his senior and plays as a goaltender. Because the two brothers were so close in age, Jesperi would play with players in Kasperi's age group (1999 born). Mikael took a job as an assistant coach in Ässät's under-20 team in 2006 (eventually working his way up to head coach of the men's team), which allowed Jesperi and Kasperi unlimited access to the club's facilities, so they spent most of their time on the ice as children.

Upon being drafted by the Canadiens, Kotkaniemi began studying French.

Playing career

Finland
Kotkaniemi began his youth career playing with hometown club, Porin Ässät, as a 14-year old at the under-16 level in 2014. Having progressed through the junior ranks and showing offensive potential, Kotkaniemi made his Liiga debut with Ässät to start the 2017–18 season, on 9 September 2017 where he scored his first professional goal. As a 17-year old rookie, Kotkaniemi posted impressive offensive totals, collecting 10 goals and 29 points in 57 games.

Montreal Canadiens
On 22 June 2018, having been touted amongst the top players by the NHL Central Scouting service, Kotkaniemi was drafted third overall in the 2018 NHL Entry Draft by the Montreal Canadiens. After attending the club's development camp, he was signed to a three-year, entry-level contract on 2 July 2018.

On 3 October 2018, Kotkaniemi made his NHL debut against the Toronto Maple Leafs; he earned one assist in the loss. He thus became the first person born in the year 2000 to play in one of the Big Four professional sports leagues in North America. Kotkaniemi scored his first and second NHL goals on 1 November 2018 against the Washington Capitals. At 18 years, 118 days old, he became the second youngest goal scorer in Canadiens' history behind Mario Tremblay, who tallied his first goal at age 18 years, 75 days on 16 November 1974 against the New York Rangers at the Forum. Kotkaniemi added a second goal in the third period of the same game, tying the score at 4–4 en route to a 6–4 Montreal victory, and becoming the youngest player in NHL history not born in North America to score at least twice in one NHL game.  He surpassed fellow Finn Patrik Laine, who, at 18 years, 183 days, recorded a hat trick for the Winnipeg Jets in a 5–4 win against the Toronto Maple Leafs on 19 October 2016. On 6 January 2019, during a game against the Nashville Predators, Kotkaniemi became the third Canadiens player to score 20 points before the age of 19. A month later on 5 February, Kotkaniemi set a new Canadiens record by becoming the first player to score goals in three straight games before the age of 19. He ultimately scored 34 points in 79 games in his rookie season.

After the season concluded, Kotkaniemi underwent knee surgery to repair a chronic minor injury. He scored his first goal of the 2019–20 season in Montreal's season opener, a 4–3 shootout loss against the Carolina Hurricanes. However, on 5 December 2019, he suffered a concussion in a game against the Colorado Avalanche, resulting in eight games lost. Kotkaniemi was reassigned to the Laval Rocket, the Canadiens' AHL affiliate, on 1 February 2020.

With the 2020–21 season delayed due to the COVID-19 pandemic, Kotkaniemi was loaned to Ässät until the start of NHL training camp.

Carolina Hurricanes
On 28 August 2021, Kotkaniemi signed a one-year, $6.1 million offer sheet with the Carolina Hurricanes. Seven days later, the Canadiens decided not to match the offer sheet, sending Kotkaniemi to Carolina with Montreal receiving their first and third-round picks in the 2022 NHL Entry Draft as compensation. Kotkaniemi was the first NHL player to be successfully acquired via offer sheet since Dustin Penner in 2007. The Kotkaniemi affair drew parallels to an offer sheet the Canadiens offered Hurricanes forward Sebastian Aho two years prior. Kotkaniemi's contract with the Hurricanes included a $20 signing bonus, a reference to the number Aho wears with Carolina, and statements issued by Hurricanes management poked fun at the Canadiens by being verbatim of statements issues by Montreal management after offer sheeting Aho.

On March 21, 2022, the Hurricanes and Kotkaniemi agreed to an eight-year, $38.5 million dollar extension, worth an annual value of $4.82 million. Kotkaniemi and Carolina had be rumored to be inking a lengthy contract worth less than his offer sheet agreement since the initial deal was signed.

International play

Kotkaniemi made his junior international debut for Finland at the 2017 World U18 Championships in Slovakia, he amassed 6 points in 7 games to help claim a silver medal.

He returned for the following 2018 World U18 Championships in Russia, centering the top-line in recording 9 points in 7 tournament contests, helping Finland secure the gold medal over United States. He was also recognized as a top 3 on team Finland by the IIHF.

Career statistics

Regular season and playoffs

International

References

External links

2000 births
Living people
Ässät players
Carolina Hurricanes players
Ice hockey players at the 2016 Winter Youth Olympics
Finnish ice hockey centres
Laval Rocket players
Montreal Canadiens draft picks
Montreal Canadiens players
National Hockey League first-round draft picks
People from Pori